Michael Seth Maness (born October 14, 1988) is an American former professional baseball pitcher. He previously played in Major League Baseball (MLB) for the St. Louis Cardinals and Kansas City Royals.

Early life and amateur career
Maness was born in Pinehurst, North Carolina. The son of Michael Maness and Jan Andrews Benton, he has two siblings—Bailey and Tanner. He attended Pinecrest High School in Southern Pines, North Carolina, where he played for the school's baseball team. As a sophomore, he earned first team All-State and conference Player of the Year honors. His father served as one of his coaches.

Following high school, Maness enrolled at East Carolina University, majoring in accounting. He played college baseball for the East Carolina Pirates where he became a four-time first team All-Conference USA performer (2008–11). In 2009, he played collegiate summer baseball with the Bourne Braves of the Cape Cod Baseball League. He finished his ECU career as the Pirates career leader in wins (38), strike outs (321), innings pitched (411.2), and games started (61). In 2010 Maness was named Conference USA Pitcher of the Year. The Florida Marlins drafted Maness in the 41st round of the 2010 MLB draft, but he did not sign.

Professional career

St. Louis Cardinals
The St. Louis Cardinals selected Maness in the 11th round of the 2011 MLB draft, and he signed with them.

Maness started his professional career with the Batavia Muckdogs of the Class A-Short Season New York–Penn League. After appearing in the All-Star Game, the Cardinals promoted him to the Palm Beach Cardinals of the Class A-Advanced Florida State League. He finished the season with the Quad Cities River Bandits of the Class A Midwest League.

Maness is noted for his control: in  innings pitched in 2012, he allowed only ten walks. Maness was named to the Texas League postseason All-Star team in 2012.  On November 30, 2012, Maness was named the Cardinals' Minor League Pitcher of the Year. His efforts on the mound helped Double A Springfield as they were named Minor League Team of the Year by Baseball America. On April 29, 2013, Maness was called up to the major leagues due to the Cardinals' struggling bullpen.

Maness made his MLB debut on May 3. He pitched one inning in his debut, against the Milwaukee Brewers at Miller Park in the eighth inning, giving up no hits, and getting three consecutive groundouts (the third out hit to him) for his debut, following the seventh inning debut of Carlos Martinez who was brought up earlier that day. On May 15, 2013, he became the first Cardinal rookie pitcher since 1900 with three relief wins in his first five major league appearances.  In 66 games with St. Louis, Maness went 5–2 with 15 holds, 1 save and a 2.32 ERA, striking out 35 in 62 innings. He led the team in ERA.

Maness pitched five effective innings in the Cardinals postseason run, posting an earned run average of 1.80. The one earned run he surrendered was a three-run home run to Jonny Gomes in Game 4 of the 2013 World Series. The Cardinals would not lead in a World Series game after this home run, falling in six games.

An arbitration-eligible player prior to the 2016 season, Maness and the Cardinals agreed to a one-year, $1.4 million contract on January 15, 2016.

After yielding a 6.39 ERA for the season, and his velocity on all four pitches down 2-3 mph, he landed on the DL for the first time in his career on May 14, after an exam revealed an inflammation on his right (pitching) elbow. He was having pitching difficulties, getting hit hard in his previous  inning work against the Anaheim Angels on May 12. For the season, he has a 6.39 ERA and 1.97 WHIP in  innings. He will eventually be able to join a Minor League affiliate on a rehab assignment, instead of as a member of that club's roster. That rehab assignment can last up to 30 days. On August 16, Maness was placed on the disabled list with an elbow strain. It was later revealed that Maness would need to undergo Tommy John surgery, effectively ending his 2016 season and likely for most of the 2017 season.

After a medical review of his injury, Maness had surgery on August 18, to fix his Ulnar collateral ligament of elbow joint instead of Tommy John surgery ligament replacement, drastically reducing his recovery time from 12–15 months to 6–8 months, which would make him available for Spring Training in 2017.

The Cardinals non-tendered him on December 2, 2016, making him a free agent.

Kansas City Royals
On February 13, 2017, the Royals announced that Maness signed a minor league contract, with a $1.25 million incentive for reaching the major leagues. The Royals promoted Maness to the major leagues on May 10. He resigned a minor league deal on November 2, 2017. Maness was released from the organization on May 10, 2018.

High Point Rockers
On February 7, 2019, Maness signed with the High Point Rockers of the Atlantic League of Professional Baseball.

Texas Rangers
On May 1, 2019, Maness's contract was purchased by the Texas Rangers and he was assigned to the Triple-A Nashville Sounds. He produced a 8–4 record with a 5.38 ERA over 117 innings for Nashville and was named a 2019 Pacific Coast League All-Star. He became a free agent on November 4, 2019. On October 14, 2020, Maness announced his retirement from professional baseball.

Coaching career
In January 2022, Maness joined the UNC Wilmington men's baseball team as the Coordinator of Player Development and spent the entire Spring 2022 season with the Seahawks. On August 18, 2022, Maness was hired by Florida State University as a Graduate Assistant coaching under Link Jarrett, Maness' assistant coach during his collegiate playing career at East Carolina.

References

External links

1988 births
Living people
Major League Baseball pitchers
Baseball players from North Carolina
People from Pinehurst, North Carolina
St. Louis Cardinals players
Kansas City Royals players
East Carolina Pirates baseball players
Bourne Braves players
Batavia Muckdogs players
Palm Beach Cardinals players
Quad Cities River Bandits players
Springfield Cardinals players
Memphis Redbirds players
Omaha Storm Chasers players
High Point Rockers players
Nashville Sounds players